John Brown's Fort was originally built in 1848 for use as a guard and fire engine house by the federal Harpers Ferry Armory in Harpers Ferry, Virginia (since 1863, West Virginia). An 1848 military report described the building as "An engine and guard-house 35 1/2 x 24 feet, one story brick, covered with slate, and having copper gutters and down spouts…"

The building achieved fame when it became John Brown (abolitionist)'s refuge during his 1859 raid on Harper's Ferry. It is the only surviving building of the Armory; the others were destroyed during the Civil War.

The building quickly became a tourist attraction; the words John Brown's Fort—a new name—were painted over the three doors, to attract tourists.  It has been moved four times: in 1891 to the World's Columbian Exposition in Chicago, in 1895 to the Murphey Farm near Harpers Ferry, in 1909 to the campus of historically black Storer College in Harpers Ferry, and in 1968 by the National Park Service to its present location in lower Harpers Ferry, near its original site.  An obelisk stands where it was originally located.  The building and obelisk are part of the Harpers Ferry National Historical Park.

In 2016 the building was honored with a U.S. quarter.

John Brown's raid

John Brown planned to capture the armory and the associated arsenal and use them to supply an army of abolitionists and run-away slave guerrillas. Beginning their raid the night of October 16, Brown and his small army of 21 men (16 white and 5 black) captured the armory and arsenal and succeeded in taking 60 citizens of Harpers Ferry hostage. The local militia and armed townspeople killed several members of the insurrection and forced Brown to take up position in the sturdy fire engine house, where Brown's men had placed several of the hostages, and prepared to use the building for defense. On the night of October 17, U.S. Marines and then Brevet Colonel Robert E. Lee and his aide J.E.B. Stuart, at the instruction of President Buchanan, arrived in Harpers Ferry to put down Brown's insurrection. The next morning, using a ladder as a battering ram, the Marines broke down the door and stormed the fire engine house. One Marine was mortally wounded in the attack, as well as several of Brown's men. Some of Brown's men managed to escape, but most were captured, including Brown, who was stabbed by the Marine commander, Lt. Green. The hostages were freed.

After the raid
The engine house was the only part of the Harper's Ferry Armory still standing after the Civil War. There was much combat in and around Harpers Ferry, which changed hands several times during the war.

To attract tourists, who were primarily Black, the words "John Brown's Fort" were painted on the engine house. It "was a tourist destination—almost a shrine—for African Americans in the late nineteenth century." However, by 1882 it had fallen into a state of disrepair; the roof and windows were gone.

 
Many bricks were taken and/or sold as souvenirs; Frederick Douglass had one at his home in Washington. In the nineteenth century silver engravings of the Fort were attached to souvenir bricks; one is in the Park museum (see picture at right). Another was painted and given to an unnamed museum.

Some white townspeople, for whom Brown was a madman and traitor rather than a hero, were not happy having the structure in their town, nor the Black tourists it attracted.

The four moves

Move to Chicago
In order to move its tracks to a less flood-prone location, the Baltimore and Ohio Railroad purchased the Fort and the land it is on, and wanted it moved or torn down. In 1891, the building was sold for $1,000 to a buyer who wished to use it as an attraction at the World's Columbian Exposition in Chicago (1st move), "but the venture proved a failure, simply because there was nothing which could connect the 'Brown Fort' with Chicago." The building was dismantled and abandoned on a vacant lot after the exhibition. Another report says that it was used as storage for delivery wagons.

In 1894, a movement was spearheaded by Washington D.C. journalist Kate Field, who also helped save the John Brown Farm State Historic Site, to preserve the building and move it back to Harpers Ferry. It could not be moved back to its original location because the Baltimore and Ohio Railroad had covered it with an embankment in 1894, raising the rail line several feet to reduce the threat from flooding. The original location was marked in 1895 by the Baltimore and Ohio Railroad with a white stone obelisk. It stands  from the present-day location of the fort, and is also part of Harpers Ferry National Historic Park.

Return to vicinity of Harpers Ferry

The Baltimore and Ohio Railroad offered free shipping of the disassembled Fort back to Harpers Ferry (2nd move); they had lost ridership when the Fort was moved to Chicago. As a new site, Alexander and Mary Murphy offered  of their farm about 2 miles (3 km) above Harpers Ferry; Storer College offered only 2 acres. Among the contributors to the funds raised for its disassembly and reconstruction were William McKinley, at that time Governor of Ohio, and Roswell P. Flower, Governor of New York. Reconstruction of John Brown's Fort on the Murphy farm was completed by November 1895, and included the gates that surrounded the fort. Eight thousand bricks were required to replace those that had been lost. While it was in that location Murphy used it as a "barracks" and "to house a wheat crop".

The Murphy farm, originally established September 1, 1869, was purchased by the National Park Service through the Trust for Public Land on December 31, 2002; it is now part of the Harpers Ferry National Historical Park.

The move of the Fort back to Harpers Ferry attracted African-American visitors, as the railroad hoped. The first national convention of the National League of Colored Women met in Washington, D.C., and took an excursion to Harpers Ferry to see John Brown's Fort.

Visitors reached a peak in 1906, when the first American meeting of the Niagara Movement—a predecessor of the NAACP, whose first meeting was held in Fort Erie, Ontario, Canada—was held in Harpers Ferry, at Storer College. Attendees held an on-site memorial for Brown they called "John Brown Day" (August 17). Over one hundred prominent African-American men and women walked from Storer to the Fort's location, among them W.E.B. DuBois, Lewis Douglas, and W. T. Greener. The leader of the procession, a physician from Brooklyn named Owen Waller, "took off his shoes and socks and walked barefoot as if he were treading on holy ground". Marching to a Monument for Freedom, painting by Richard Fitzhugh.

Move to Storer College

As a direct result, the Fort was moved again (the 3rd move), in 1909, from 
this "somewhat inaccessible" site to Storer College, where it remained until 1969, longer (as of 2021) than it has been at any other location since 1859. The College, which closed in 1955, bought John Brown's Fort from Alexander Murphy for $900—Murphy wanted compensation for the damage the many tourists did to his crops—and moved it to the college's campus. It was disassembled and when on the Storer Campus it was inadvertently reassembled backwards, as the builders did not realize that the glass negative they were using as a guide had a reversed image.

While there, it was used as the college museum. Glass cases of museum quality contained "a collection of old guns, helmets, money and other curiosities". An elevated gallery was added. The college published Captain John Brown and Harper's Ferry, a pamphlet about Brown and the Fort, written by Brown scholar Boyd Stutler.

Students gave tours of the Fort. "They took great pride in that. That symbol of freedom meant a lot to those students." At the time, these student tours were required of many students, to give them practice in public speaking.

In 1918, the alumni of Storer paid for a plaque attached to the west wall of the firehouse (picture at right). The plaque reads:

THAT THIS NATION MIGHT HAVE
A NEW BIRTH OF FREEDOM
THAT SLAVERY SHOULD BE REMOVED 
FOREVER FROM AMERICAN SOIL

AND HIS 21 MEN GAVE THEIR
LIVES.
TO COMMEMORATE THEIR
HEROISM THIS TABLET IS 
PLACED ON THIS BUILDING
WHICH HAS SINCE BEEN
KNOWN AS

BY THE
ALUMNI OF STORER COLLEGE
1918

The National Park Service, through its Historic American Buildings Survey, has made public numerous photographs, plans, and descriptions of the building as it was at Storer College.

When the College closed, the museum collection was auctioned off to pay debts, and borrowed items were returned to their owners.

The National Park Service acquires and moves the building
When Harpers Ferry National Monument was created, it did not include John Brown's Fort or its original location. The local Black community was opposed to having it moved away from the College grounds, and the College trustees were "squeamish" about turning it over to the Park Service. The Park Service was accused of using "white paternalism" to oppose Black wishes and detract from the significance of the Raid for African Americans.

In 1960 the National Park Service acquired the building, which remained the main tourist attraction in Harpers Ferry. In the early 1960s local concessionaires operated a private gift shop in it. Many visitors came to visit it at the College, to the point that they made it difficult to carry out the Park Service's plans for the former College. Park Superintendent Joseph Prentice wanted to "drastically eliminate the hordes of visitors and their automobiles from this location".

To accomplish this goal, removing "the only important attraction from the Storer College campus", in 1968 the Park Service moved it once more (the 4th move). The original location is covered by a Baltimore & Ohio Railroad embankment, so it was moved to a location close to the original, actually the most central location in Harpers Ferry. It is the most visited tourist attraction in the state of West Virginia.

From the point of view of crowd management, the Fort was placed in Arsenal Square so as to discourage parking in lower Harpers Ferry. Satellite parking and shuttle buses were set up.

The structure is not fully authentic due to the number of times it has been dismantled, moved, and reassembled.The doors are not original; at the Armory the building was painted grey. (See poster at right.) As stated above, 8,000 bricks replace original ones taken as souvenirs. It is also not an exact replica, as portions of the building were "rebuilt backwards", because builders were working from a negative and did not realize it needed to be turned over to see the building correctly. It was described in 2005 as "a bit smaller than its original size". "The age of the various parts of the building cannot be authenticated", is the comment of the Historic American Buildings Survey.

A Harpers Ferry Historical Association publication states that "the John Brown Museum" now houses the original armory gate. It had been taken by Alexander Murphy, who used it as outer gate to his coal yard, and had tried to sell it in 1927. It was donated in 1991 to the National Park Service by Jim Kuhn, a great-great-grandson of the Murphys.

Subsequent to the National Park Service's move of the building, it acquired the original site, along with portions of the former Armory grounds, through land swaps with CSX, the current (2021) operator of the former Baltimore and Ohio route. As of 2021 the NPS has no immediate plans to use it.

Controversy over Armory bell

During a Union Army occupation of Harpers Ferry, a contingent of soldiers from Marlborough, Massachusetts, removed a bell hanging in the Harpers Ferry arsenal firehouse. Thirty years later, it was taken to Marlborough, where it has remained. Harpers Ferry has attempted to retrieve the bell without success.

In July 2011, Howard Swint, of Charleston, West Virginia, stated that the bell was taken without authorization. In legal terms, according to Swint, it was stolen, and still belongs to the federal government. Swint filed a lawsuit in Boston's US District Court but since the bell's original Federal records proving ownership were apparently lost in a fire, the judge dismissed the case without prejudice.  Swint's legal actions generated controversy in the Marlborough area, but the bell has stayed in Massachusetts.

Replica at Discovery Park of America
An approximate replica of the firehouse was built in 2012 at the Discovery Park of America museum park in Union City, Tennessee. There is a marker explaining the link with John Brown's raid.

See also
 Heyward Shepherd monument
 John Brown's raid on Harpers Ferry
 Niagara Movement
 Storer College

Notes

References

Further reading

External links
John Brown's Fort,  National Park Service page.
Photos and images of Fort held at Library of Congress

Landmarks in West Virginia
Fort
Fort
Infrastructure completed in 1848
Harpers Ferry, West Virginia
Museums in Jefferson County, West Virginia
History museums in West Virginia
Historic American Buildings Survey in West Virginia
Rebuilt buildings and structures in West Virginia
Relocated buildings and structures in West Virginia
Buildings and structures in Harpers Ferry, West Virginia
Storer College buildings
African-American historic places
Niagara Movement
American Civil War museums in West Virginia
John Brown sites
Monuments and memorials to John Brown (abolitionist)